Ian Arthur Bremmer (born November 12, 1969) is an American political scientist, author, and entrepreneur who focuses on global political risk. He is the founder and president of Eurasia Group, a political risk research and consulting firm. He is also a founder of GZERO Media, a digital media firm.

Early life and education
Bremmer is of Armenian (from his maternal grandmother), Italian, and German descent, the son of Maria J. (née Scrivano) and Arthur Bremmer. His father served in the Korean War and died at the age of 46 when Bremmer was four. He grew up in housing projects in Chelsea, Massachusetts, near Boston.  Bremmer went to St. Dominic Savio High School in East Boston. He later earned a BA in international relations, magna cum laude, from Tulane University in 1989 and a PhD in political science from Stanford University in 1994, writing "The politics of ethnicity: Russians in the Ukraine".

Career

Eurasia Group 
Bremmer founded the political risk research and consulting firm Eurasia Group in 1998 in the offices of the World Policy Institute in New York City. The firm opened a London office in 2000; a Washington, DC office (2005); a Tokyo office (2015); San Francisco and São Paulo offices (2016}; and Brasilia and Singapore offices {2017}. Initially focused on emerging markets, Eurasia Group expanded to include frontier and developed economies and established practices focused on geo-technology and energy issues. Bremmer has co-authored Eurasia Group’s annual Top Risks report, a forecast of 10 geopolitical risks for the year ahead.

Writing 
Bremmer has published 11 books on global affairs. In addition, he is the foreign-affairs columnist and editor-at-large for Time and a contributor for the Financial Times A-List.

Appointments 
Bremmer has held positions at New York University, Columbia University, the EastWest Institute, the World Policy Institute, Lawrence Livermore National Laboratory, and the Asia Society Policy Institute, where he has served as the Harold J. Newman Distinguished Fellow in Geopolitics.

In 2013, he was named Global Research Professor at New York University. and in 2019, Columbia University's School of International and Public Affairs announced that Bremmer would teach an Applied Geopolitics course at the school.

Key concepts
Bremmer's research fields include: international political economy, geoeconomics and geopolitics, states in transition and global emerging markets, and US foreign policy.

J-Curve

Bremmer's book, The J Curve, outlines the link between a country's openness and its stability. While many countries are stable because they are open (the United States, France, Japan), others are stable because they are closed (North Korea, Cuba, Iraq under Saddam Hussein). States can travel both forward (right) and backward (left) along this J curve, so stability and openness are never secure. The J is steeper on the left-hand side, as it is easier for a leader in a failed state to create stability by closing the country than to build a civil society and establish accountable institutions; the curve is higher on the far right because states that prevail in opening their societies (Eastern Europe, for example) ultimately become more stable than authoritarian regimes. The book was listed as a top 10 pick by The Economist in 2006.

State capitalism
Bremmer describes state capitalism as a system in which the state dominates markets primarily for political gain. In his 2010 book The End of the Free Market: Who Wins the War Between States and Corporations, Bremmer describes China as the primary driver for the rise of state capitalism as a challenge to the free market economies of the developed world, particularly in the aftermath of the financial crisis.

G-Zero
The term G-Zero world refers to a breakdown in global leadership brought about by a decline of Western influence and the inability of other nations to fill the void. It is a reference to a perceived shift away from the pre-eminence of the ["G7"] ("Group of Seven") industrialized countries and the expanded Group of Twenty, which includes major emerging powers like China, India, Brazil, Turkey, and others. In his book, Every Nation for Itself: Winners and Losers in a G-Zero World (New York: Portfolio, 2012), Bremmer explains that, in the G-Zero, no country or group of countries has the political and economic leverage to drive an international agenda or provide global public goods.

Weaponization of finance
The term weaponization of finance refers to the foreign policy strategy of using incentives (access to capital markets) and penalties (varied types of sanctions) as tools of coercive diplomacy. In his Eurasia Group Top Risks 2015 report.   

Bremmer coins the term weaponization of finance to describe the ways in which the United States is using its influence to affect global outcomes. Rather than rely on traditional elements of America's security advantage – including US-led alliances such as NATO and multilateral institutions such as the World Bank and the International Monetary Fund – Bremmer argues that the US is now "weaponizing finance" by limiting access to the American marketplace and to US banks as an instrument of its foreign and security policy.

Pivot state
Bremmer uses pivot state to describe a nation that is able to build profitable relationships with multiple other major powers without becoming overly reliant on any one of them. This ability to hedge allows a pivot state to avoid capture—in terms of security or economy—at the hands of a single country. At the opposite end of the spectrum are shadow states, frozen within the influence of a single power. Canada is an example of a pivot state: with significant trade ties with both the United States and Asia, and formal security ties with NATO, it is hedged against conflict with any single major power. Mexico, on the other hand, is a shadow state due to its overwhelming reliance on the US economy.  In Every Nation for Itself, Bremmer says that in a volatile G-Zero world, the ability to pivot will take on increased importance.

Geopolitical recession 
Bremmer coined the term “geopolitical recession” to describe the current geopolitical environment, one defined by an unwinding of the former US-led global order. Unlike economic recessions, linked to frequent boom and bust cycles, Bremmer sees geopolitical recessions as much longer cycles that are less likely to be recognized.  He sees the present geopolitical recession as defined by deteriorating relations between the US and its traditional allies—particularly the Europeans—as China is rising and creating an alternative international political and economic architecture. Bremmer argues that the overall result is a more fragmented approach to global governance, an increase in geopolitical tail risks, and a reduced ability to respond effectively to major international crises.

World Data Organization 
Bremmer proposed creating a “World Data Organization” to forestall a division in technology ecosystems due to conflict between the United States and China. He described it as a digital version of the World Trade Organization, arguing that the United States, Europe, Japan, and other “governments that believe in online openness and transparency” should collaborate to set standards for artificial intelligence, data, privacy, citizens’ rights, and intellectual property. 2020 Democratic party presidential nominee candidate Andrew Yang expressed his support for such an organization during his campaign.

Technopolarity 
Bremmer originated the term “technopolarity” in his 2021 Foreign Affairs article “The Technopolar Moment.”  Drawing on the swift response by tech companies in the aftermath of the 2021 United States Capitol insurrection, Bremmer says that tech giants like Amazon, Apple, Facebook, Google, and Alibaba have accumulated more power than any large corporations of the past. He says these nonstate actors are now shaping geopolitics and exercise a form of sovereignty over a rapidly expanding realm that is out of reach from national governments: the digital space.

Other organizations

Eurasia Group Foundation
In 2016, Bremmer founded the Eurasia Group Foundation (EGF), a 501(c)3 public charity. Bremmer currently serves as the Eurasia Group Foundation’s board president.

GZERO Media
In 2017, Bremmer and Eurasia Group launched digital media company GZERO Media, and a US national public television show called GZERO World with Ian Bremmer on PBS. The company’s name refers to the term coined by Bremmer in Every Nation for Itself to describe a world where no country or group of countries has the political and economic leverage to drive an international agenda or provide global public goods. As a part of the company's public outreach concept, they have a recurring segment, Puppet Regime, which makes use of street interviews and short narrative sketch formats using puppets.

Controversies 
In March 2016, Bremmer sent a weekly note to clients where he unintentionally came up with the "America First" slogan used by Donald Trump. The note described then-candidate Trump's foreign policy not as isolationism but as a policy of "America First," a transactional, unilateralist perspective that was more a Chinese than American framework for foreign policy. Bremmer used the term to help explain Trump’s foreign policy views and not as a campaign slogan. A few weeks later, New York Times reporters David Sanger and Maggie Haberman, both of whom receive Bremmer's weekly note, conducted Trump’s first foreign policy interview and asked him if he would describe himself as an isolationist. He said no. They then asked Trump if he considered himself an adherent of America First. Trump said yes and liked the term so much he started using it himself. Haberman later credited Bremmer with coming up with “America First” to describe Trump’s foreign policy.

In July 2017, Bremmer broke news of a second, previously undisclosed meeting between Presidents Trump and Putin during the G20 heads of state dinner in Hamburg. He wrote about the meeting in his weekly client note and later appeared on Charlie Rose to discuss the meeting’s implications. Other major media outlets quickly picked up the news. Newsweek profiled Bremmer in an article titled "Who is Eurasia Group’s Ian Bremmer, the risk consultant who exposed the second Trump-Putin meeting?" Trump initially denied that his second meeting with Putin had taken place and called Bremmer's report "fake news." However, then-White House Press Secretary Sarah Huckabee Sanders later held a press conference and admitted the second meeting had occurred.

In 2019, Donald Trump issued a Tweet that appeared to praise North Korean leader Kim Jong Un for criticizing rival Joe Biden: "I have confidence that Chairman Kim will keep his promise to me, & also smiled when he called Swampman Joe Biden a low IQ individual, & worse." In reaction, Bremmer Tweeted: "President Trump in Tokyo: 'Kim Jong Un is smarter and would make a better President than Sleepy Joe Biden.'" After he was criticized on Twitter for appearing to quote Trump falsely, Bremmer acknowledged that President Trump had not spoken as Bremmer had quoted him and suggested that the statement was facetious, calling it "objectively a completely ludicrous quote." President Trump used the incident to call for stronger libel laws.

In October 2022, Elon Musk tweeted, "Nobody should trust Bremmer" in reply to a tweet by Bremmer saying, "elon musk told me he had spoken with putin and the kremlin directly about ukraine. he also told me what the kremlin’s red lines were."

Bibliography

Books 
 Soviet Nationalities Problems. (edited with Norman Naimark), (Stanford: Stanford Center for Russian and East European Studies: 1990). 
 Nations and Politics in the Soviet Successor States. (edited with Raymond Taras), (Cambridge: Cambridge University Press, 1993). 
  New States, New Politics: Building the Post-Soviet Nations. (edited with Raymond Taras), (Cambridge: Cambridge University Press, 1997). 
 The J Curve: A New Way to Understand Why Nations Rise and Fall. (Simon & Schuster, 2006; revised paperback, 2007). 
 Managing Strategic Surprise: Lessons from Risk Management & Risk Assessment. (edited with Paul Bracken and David Gordon), (Cambridge: Cambridge University Press, 2008). 
 The Fat Tail: The Power of Political Knowledge for Strategic Investing. (with Preston Keat), (New York: Oxford University Press, 2009; revised paperback, 2010). 
 The End of the Free Market: Who Wins the War Between States and Corporations. (New York: Portfolio, 2010; revised paperback 2011). 
 Every Nation for Itself: Winners and Losers in a G-Zero World. (New York: Portfolio, May 2012; revised paperback 2013). 
 Superpower: Three Choices for America's Role in the World. (New York: Portfolio, May 2015). 
 Us vs Them: The Failure of Globalism. (New York: Portfolio, April 2018). 
 The Power of Crisis: How Three Threats--And Our Response--Will Change The World. (New York: Simon and Schuster, May 2022).

Articles 
 
———————
Notes

References

External links

 Official website
 Profile at Eurasia Group
 A Second Look... by Ian Bremmer
 Ted Talk: What the War in Ukraine Means for the Global Order
 The End of the American International Order: What Comes Next? by Ian Bremmer 
 

1969 births
Living people
American political scientists
Columbia University faculty
Stanford University alumni
International relations scholars
Tulane University alumni
Writers about globalization
People from Chelsea, Massachusetts
American people of Armenian descent
American people of German descent
American people of Italian descent
Carnegie Council for Ethics in International Affairs
Time (magazine) people